Sports biomechanics is a quantitative based study and analysis of professional athletes and sports activities in general. It can simply be described as the physics of sports. In this subfield of biomechanics the laws of mechanics are applied in order to gain a greater understanding of athletic performance through mathematical modeling, computer simulation and measurement.
Biomechanics is the study of the structure and function of biological systems by means of the methods of mechanics (the branch of physics involving analysis of the actions of forces). Within mechanics there are two sub-fields of study: statics, which is the study of systems that are in a state of constant motion either at rest (with no motion) or moving with a constant velocity; and dynamics, which is the study of systems in motion in which acceleration is present, which may involve kinematics (the study of the motion of bodies with respect to time, displacement, velocity, and speed of movement either in a straight line or in a rotary direction) and kinetics (the study of the forces associated with motion, including forces causing motion and forces resulting from motion). Sports biomechanists help people obtain optimal muscle recruitment and performance. A biomechanist also uses their knowledge to apply proper load barring techniques to preserve the body.

Things related to biomechanics 
Food
Engineering mechanics
Muscle mechanics
Motor coordination
Kinematics
Inverse dynamics
Statics
Kinetics
Velocity
Displacement
Acceleration
Moment of Inertia
Torque
Digital filters

Experimental sports biomechanics 
Methods:

3D Motion capture analysis
Force plates
Force transducers
Strain gauges
Anthropometric measurements (mathematical models)
Surface EMG (Electromyography)

Research and applications 

Golf swing
Tennis
Gymnastics
Track and field
Running blades
Swimming
Diving
Skiing
Trampoline
Rowing
Baseball
Figure Skating
Exergaming design and evaluation
Movement Assessment
Olympic weightlifting
Powerlifting

See also 
Leonardo da Vinci

References

Bibliography

External links 
Modelling Biomechanics - Athletes go to the max -  Scientific Computing World
Loughborough University - Sports Biomechanics and Motor Control Research Group
International Society of Biomechanics in Sports
BASES - The British Association of Sport and Exercise Sciences. Biomechanics
History of Biomechanics - Ariel Dynamics Video Library
Vicon | Products | Cameras
Kistler - Sports and performance diagnostics
Analysis - National Instruments
PhysiMax | Products | Movement Performance 3D

Biomechanics
Physical exercise
Sports science

ru:Биомеханика спорта